Jacques Gautier (born 18 September 1946 in Aix-en-Provence) is a French politician and a member of the Senate of France. He represents the Hauts-de-Seine department and is a member of the Union for a Popular Movement Party.

References
Page on the Senate website

1946 births
Living people
People from Aix-en-Provence
Union for a Popular Movement politicians
Gaullism, a way forward for France
French Senators of the Fifth Republic
Senators of Hauts-de-Seine